Haakon Opsahl (10 November 1905 – 30 May 2001) was a Norwegian and Canadian chess player.

Biography
Haakon Opsahl was a native of Norway. Since the early 1930s he lived in Canadian province Quebec on the coast of Lake Timiskaming. In 1933, Haakon Opsahl participated in U.S. Open Chess Championship. In 1936, he participated in Canadian Chess Championship.

Haakon Opsahl played for Canada (1939) and Norway (1950) in the Chess Olympiads:
 In 1939, at third board in the 8th Chess Olympiad in Buenos Aires (+7, =5, -3),
 In 1950, at reserve board in the 9th Chess Olympiad in Dubrovnik (+0, =1, -8).

References

External links

Haakon Opsahl chess games at 365chess.com

1905 births
2001 deaths
Canadian chess players
Norwegian chess players
Chess Olympiad competitors
20th-century chess players